Bruno Saul (8 January 1932 – 3 March 2022) was an Estonian politician.

Saul was born in Narva on 8 January 1930. From 1983 to 1988, he was serving as the Chairman of the Council of Ministers of the Estonian Soviet Socialist Republic, or last Communist-era Prime Minister, succeeding Valter Klauson who served for 22 years.

Saul died on 3 March 2022, at the age of 90.

References

1932 births
2022 deaths
Communist Party of Estonia politicians
Heads of the Communist Party of Estonia
Eleventh convocation members of the Supreme Soviet of the Soviet Union
Central Committee of the Communist Party of the Soviet Union candidate members
Members of the Supreme Soviet of the Estonian Soviet Socialist Republic, 1975–1980
Members of the Supreme Soviet of the Estonian Soviet Socialist Republic, 1980–1985
Members of the Supreme Soviet of the Estonian Soviet Socialist Republic, 1985–1990
Recipients of the USSR State Prize
Recipients of the Order of the Red Banner of Labour
Politicians from Narva